Michael Zyda (or Michael J. Zyda or Mike Zyda) is an American computer scientist, video game designer, and Professor of Computer Science Practice at USC Viterbi School of Engineering, University of Southern California. He was named an IEEE Fellow in 2019 and an ACM Fellow in 2020 for his research contributions in video game design and virtual reality. He is also the founding director of the Computer Science (Games) degree programs at USC Viterbi. Michael received his bachelor's degree in bioengineering from University of California, San Diego, master's degree in computer science from University of Massachusetts Amherst and doctoral degree in computer science from University of Washington.

References

External links 

Fellows of the Association for Computing Machinery
University of California, San Diego alumni
University of Massachusetts Amherst alumni
Fellow Members of the IEEE
Year of birth missing (living people)
Living people